When Fate Rebelled is a 1915 American short silent drama film, directed by Jack Harvey. It stars Boyd Marshall, Muriel Ostriche, and Frank Wood.

References

External links
When Fate Rebelled at the Internet Movie Database

1915 films
American silent short films
Silent American drama films
1915 drama films
1915 short films
Films directed by Jack Harvey
Thanhouser Company films
American black-and-white films
1910s American films